Mount Seattle is a  mountain summit located deep within Olympic National Park in Jefferson County of Washington state. Part of the Olympic Mountains, Mount Seattle is situated 7.5 miles southeast of Mount Olympus, and set within the Quinault Rainforest and Daniel J. Evans Wilderness. The nearest higher neighbor is Mount Meany,  to the north-northwest, and Mount Noyes rises one mile to the northwest. Precipitation runoff from the mountain drains north into headwaters of the Elwha River, and south into tributaries of the Quinault River. Low Divide forms the saddle between Mt. Seattle and Mount Christie.

History

The mountain was named on April 29, 1890, by James Halbold Christie, leader of the 1889-90 Seattle Press Expedition, and Charles Adams Barnes, the expedition's topographer. Christie was sponsored by the Seattle newspaper Press, and named the mountain in honor of the city of Seattle. Observations from Mount Seattle enabled Barnes to finally complete his map of the Olympic Mountains.

The first documented ascent of the summit was made in 1907 by Asahel Curtis, Grant Humes, and Lorenz Nelson who were reconnoitering for The Mountaineers first ascent attempt at Mount Olympus. Three scramble routes to the summit have been established: via Noyes Basin, via Seattle Creek Basin, and via Low Divide.

Climate

Based on the Köppen climate classification, Mount Seattle is located in the marine west coast climate zone of western North America. Most weather fronts originate in the Pacific Ocean, and travel east toward the Olympic Mountains. As fronts approach, they are forced upward by the peaks of the Olympic Range, causing them to drop their moisture in the form of rain or snowfall (Orographic lift). As a result, the Olympics experience high precipitation, especially during the winter months. During winter months, weather is usually cloudy, but, due to high pressure systems over the Pacific Ocean that intensify during summer months, there is often little or no cloud cover during the summer. The months June through August offer the most favorable weather for viewing or climbing this mountain.

Geology

The Olympic Mountains are composed of obducted clastic wedge material and oceanic crust, primarily Eocene sandstone, turbidite, and basaltic oceanic crust. The mountains were sculpted during the Pleistocene era by erosion and glaciers advancing and retreating multiple times.

Gallery

See also

 Olympic Mountains
 Geology of the Pacific Northwest

References

External links
 
 Weather forecast: Mount Seattle

Olympic Mountains
Mountains of Washington (state)
Mountains of Jefferson County, Washington
Landforms of Olympic National Park
North American 1000 m summits